(7 October 1920 – 7 August 1944), was a Belgian resistance fighter during World War II.

Biography 
Fernande Volral was born in Champigneulles, near Nancy, in October 1920. During the 1930s, her family moved to Charleroi, in Belgium. When she became an adult, she moved to Jette, launching a career in fashion.

In 1941, she met Raoul Baligand, the leader of the Partisans Armés, and joined the Belgian underground resistance. She originally served as a liaison agent, before joining the 10 de la rue de la Perle de Molenbeek-Saint-Jean group. The group was affiliated with the Front de l'Indépendance, which mainly consisted of Italian anti-fascists who had fought in the International Brigades during the Spanish Civil War.

In late-1942, she led a number of successful sabotage missions with the group.

On 23 February 1943, she was betrayed to the fascist authorities. When German police came to arrest her at her home, she fought back, wounding one before being subdued.

She was imprisoned in Saint-Gilles Prison until being deported to Germany to be held in a prison in Leer and to be tried by the People's Court. Her trial was held on the same day as that of Marguerite Bervoets, and both women were issued with the same sentence: death. She was then transferred to Wolfenbüttel, where she was executed by beheading in early August 1944.

Legacy 
 In 1955, the town of Jette named a road after her
 A commemorative plaque about her was placed on the Avenue des Alliés in Charleroi in 2003
 A road in Charleroi was named after her in August 2020

References 

People executed by decapitation
People executed by Germany
People killed by Nazi Germany
Female resistance members of World War II
Belgian resistance members
Belgian women
1920 births
1944 deaths
Military personnel from Nancy, France